My Love Story!! (Ore Monogatari!!) is an anime television series produced by Madhouse, based on the manga series by Kazune Kawahara. The series follows the muscular but kind-hearted Takeo Gōda, who forms a romance with the timid Rinko Yamato. The series, directed by Morio Asaka and written by Natsuko Takahashi, aired in Japan between April 8, 2015 and September 23, 2015 was simulcast by Crunchyroll. The soundtrack is composed by S.E.N.S. Project. The series is licensed in North America by Sentai Filmworks.

Episode list

References

External links

 

My Love Story!!